Talladega Nights: The Ballad of Ricky Bobby is a 2006 American sports comedy film directed by Adam McKay who co-wrote the film with Will Ferrell. It features Ferrell as the titular Ricky Bobby, an immature yet successful NASCAR driver. The film also features John C. Reilly, Sacha Baron Cohen, Gary Cole, Michael Clarke Duncan, Leslie Bibb, Jane Lynch, and Amy Adams in supporting roles. NASCAR drivers Jamie McMurray and Dale Earnhardt Jr. appear in cameos, as do broadcasting teams from NASCAR on Fox (Mike Joy, Larry McReynolds, Darrell Waltrip, and Dick Berggren) and NASCAR on NBC (Bill Weber, Wally Dallenbach Jr., and Benny Parsons).

The film was released theatrically on August 4, 2006, through Sony Pictures to critical and commercial success, grossing $163.4 million worldwide on a $72 million budget.

Plot
In rural North Carolina, Ricky Bobby is born in the backseat of a speeding car when his father, Reese, accidentally misses the turnoff for the hospital. Ricky sees his father only once after that, at age 10, at school. During this encounter Reese tells Ricky, "If you ain't first, you’re last", advice which Ricky takes to heart. Fifteen years later, Ricky works on the pit crew of Dennit Racing driver Terry Cheveaux. When Cheveaux decides to take a bathroom break because he's in last place, Ricky replaces him and finishes third. Larry Dennit Sr. gives Ricky a permanent seat and he quickly rises to be one of NASCAR's most successful drivers. He meets his future wife Carley, after she flashes her breasts to him. 

Ricky persuades Dennit to field a second team for his best friend, Cal Naughton Jr., and they become an unstoppable duo using their "Shake and Bake" slingshot technique on the track. Ricky's newfound arrogance, however, aggravates Dennit's alienated son, who retaliates by adding talented, openly gay French Formula One driver Jean Girard to the team. Girard not only taunts Ricky, but he outperforms him and becomes the team's top driver. Desperate to beat Girard, Ricky exceeds his limitations and crashes at Lowe's Motor Speedway and is hospitalized. Fearful of wrecking again, Ricky's performance drastically declines. Dennit subsequently fires him and Carley leaves him for Cal, who still considers Ricky his best friend, but Ricky insists their friendship is over.

Ricky and his two unruly sons, Walker and Texas Ranger, move in with Ricky's mom Lucy, who is determined to reform the boys. Ricky takes a job as a pizza delivery man, but when he loses his driver's license he is reduced to delivering pizza by bus or by bicycle. When his life hits rock bottom, Ricky's estranged father Reese returns and, using unorthodox methods such as putting a live cougar in his car, tries to help Ricky regain his confidence. But after causing trouble at an Applebee's restaurant, Reese abandons the family again. Before he does, he refutes his quote, "If you ain't first, you're last", that has steered Ricky's life. Reese confesses that he was high when he said it, and that it does not make sense. Ricky's former assistant, Susan, persuades him to return to NASCAR. They quickly develop a romantic relationship when Ricky takes Susan's advice and races at Talladega Superspeedway. Ricky makes amends with Carley, Girard, and Cal, while re-uniting with his pit crew. With no sponsors, Ricky's car is painted with a cougar to inspire him. 

During the race, Ricky climbs from last place to second place behind Girard, and Cal uses their slingshot technique to help Ricky pass Girard. In the final laps, however, Dennit orders the driver of Ricky's former car to take Ricky out, but he causes a a massive wreck that takes out everyone except Ricky and Girard. On the last lap, Ricky and Girard collide, wrecking their cars. They hastily exit their vehicles and run towards the finish line. Ricky dives across the line first, but both drivers are disqualified for exiting their cars. As Cal takes the checkered flag, Girard offers Ricky a handshake, but Ricky responds by kissing him on the lips. Carley asks Ricky to move back in and start over, but he chooses to stay with Susan instead. In the track parking lot, Reese congratulates Ricky, who declares that it was no longer about winning since he has a family who loves him no matter where he finishes. Ricky, his family and Susan leave to go to Applebees.

In a post credits scene, Lucy is shown reading a story to Walker and Texas Ranger, both having fully been rehabilitated by her and are now polite, respectful children.

Cast

 Will Ferrell as Ricky Bobby, a NASCAR driver who only believes in winning throughout his career. He originally drove the #26 Laughing Clown Malt Liquor Chevrolet Monte Carlo until it became sponsored by Wonder Bread and Powerade during his soar to the top of NASCAR and the #62 "ME" Ford Taurus at the UAW-Ford 500.
 Jake Johnson as 5-year-old Ricky.
 Luke Bigham as 10-year-old Ricky.
 John C. Reilly as Cal Naughton Jr., Bobby's best friend and teammate. He drives the #47 Old Spice Chevrolet Monte Carlo. Reilly previously had a role in Days of Thunder.
 Austin Grimm as 10-year-old Cal.
 Sacha Baron Cohen as Jean Girard, an openly gay French Formula One driver and Bobby's archrival. Girard's dream is to move to Stockholm and design a currency for use by dogs and cats. He is described as talented, eccentric and dominating in the Formula One circuit in a SPEED broadcast segment. While challenging Bobby, Girard drives the #55 Perrier Chevrolet Monte Carlo.
 Michael Clarke Duncan as Lucius Washington, Ricky's crew chief and close friend. After Ricky's firing, he and the pit crew started a car wash, where they had a hard time adjusting to the career change. They eventually return as the pit crew of Ricky's ME car.
 Leslie Bibb as Carley Bobby, Ricky's former wife and currently Cal's wife after she fears Ricky will not successfully return to NASCAR.
 Gary Cole as Reese Bobby, Ricky's father. 
 Jane Lynch as Lucy Bobby, Ricky's mother.
 Amy Adams as Susan, Ricky's assistant and eventual love interest.
 Andy Richter as Gregory, Girard's husband and a world-class trainer of German shepherds.
 Houston Tumlin and Grayson Russell as Walker and Texas Ranger Bobby, Ricky's two sons.
 Adam McKay (the film's director) as Terry Cheveaux, an apathetic driver who is replaced by Bobby at the beginning of the film.
 David Koechner, Ian Roberts and Jack McBrayer as Hershell, Kyle and Glenn, Bobby's three pit crew members. They join Lucius at the car wash before returning to be Ricky's pit crew. Though Glenn was initially claimed to have died while working on the car, he is revealed to still be alive, and had pretend to die as extra motivation for Ricky to win.
 Pat Hingle as Larry Dennit Sr., original owner of Bobby's team, Dennit Racing who considers Ricky to be a son. After retiring, his son, Larry Dennit Jr., takes over the team halfway through Bobby's career.
 Greg Germann as Larry Dennit Jr., the current owner of Dennit Racing, who is concerned only with season point totals and winning sponsors, and dislikes Ricky and his antics.
 Molly Shannon as Mrs. Dennit, the younger Dennit's alcoholic wife.
 Ted Manson as Chip, Bobby's elderly, long-suffering former father-in-law.
 Rob Riggle as Jack Telmont, the Speed Channel commentator.
 Dale Earnhardt Jr. as one of Bobby's fans. He also appears in a deleted scene at the garage in Talladega.
 Jamie McMurray loses to Ricky at Texas Motor Speedway while driving the No. 42 Home123 Dodge Charger when Ricky wins by driving in reverse.
 C.J. Dornberger plays fictional Brian Wavecrest who replaces Bobby in the 26 car at the end of the film after being driven by the No. 86 Mopar Dodge Charger.
 Mike Joy, Darrell Waltrip and Larry McReynolds, Fox NASCAR commentators.
 Dick Berggren, a Fox NASCAR field reporter, seen interviewing Ricky in pit lane at Las Vegas Motor Speedway.
 Bill Weber, Benny Parsons and Wally Dallenbach Jr., NASCAR on NBC commentators.
 Elvis Costello and Mos Def, guests at Girard's party (Girard claimed they were not them).
 Bob Jenkins and Rick Benjamin, Speed journalists.
 Jack Blessing as Jarvis, Cal's crew chief.
 Greg Biffle, in a Special Feature but not credited.
 A cardboard stand of Dale Earnhardt appears in the infield of Talladega.
 Frank Welker as The Cougar.
 The broadcaster and various real-life NASCAR drivers and/or their cars from the 2005 racing season can also be seen, including:
Drivers: Dale Jarrett, Dale Earnhardt Jr., Kasey Kahne, Tony Stewart, J. J. Yeley, Jason Leffler, Brian Vickers, Jeff Gordon, Jimmie Johnson, Kyle Busch, Boris Said, Tony Raines, Mike Wallace, Kerry Earnhardt, Jeff Green

Cars only: Casey Mears, Jeremy Mayfield, Bobby Labonte, Terry Labonte, Travis Kvapil, Mark Martin, Carl Edwards, Mike Bliss, Scott Wimmer, Jamie McMurray, Rusty Wallace, Kurt Busch, Elliott Sadler, Greg Biffle, Matt Kenseth, Michael Waltrip, Ryan Newman, Scott Riggs, Joe Nemechek, Sterling Marlin, Jeff Burton, Ken Schrader, Kevin Lepage, Mike Skinner, Kenny Wallace, Bobby Hamilton Jr., Hermie Sadler, Robby Gordon, Kevin Harvick, Kyle Petty, and Johnny Sauter.

Production

Development
McKay and Ferrell first discussed a comedic film about a NASCAR driver while Ferrell was making Elf. Shortly after that film had wrapped, co-producer Jimmy Miller invited them to a NASCAR race in Fontana, California, after which McKay and Ferrell began writing the script. They presented the idea to studios using only a six-word pitch: "Will Ferrell as a NASCAR driver". Studios responded enthusiastically to the pitch largely due to Ferrell's recent commercial success as a comedic leading man in films like Elf, Old School and Anchorman. After a bidding war, the rights were won by Sony Pictures. McKay and Ferrell knew that in order to make the film they envisioned they would need cooperation from NASCAR. After meeting with the filmmakers, NASCAR agreed to provide assistance for the film's production. McKay and Ferrell sought to make a film that individuals involved with NASCAR would enjoy in the same way that people in the television news industry enjoyed Anchorman. Ferrell stated, "We were real adamant up front that our goal wasn't to make fun of NASCAR. We wanted to have fun with NASCAR." Despite NASCAR's involvement, many teams and drivers were reluctant to participate largely due to the negative feelings they had for the 1990 film Days of Thunder. Only two drivers ended up making cameos in the film: Dale Earnhardt Jr. and Jamie McMurray. During development, the film's title changed from Talladega Nights to "High, Wide and Handsome" before eventually reverting to the original title.

Filming
With the exception of one week of shooting at Talladega Superspeedway in Alabama, the entire film was filmed in North Carolina with the majority of filming occurring in the Charlotte Metropolitan Area. Many of the racing scenes were filmed at the Charlotte Motor Speedway in Concord, North Carolina and Rockingham Speedway also known as The Rock. Various other scenes were filmed in the Gaston County, North Carolina area, including the Pizza Delivery, DMV Driving Test, and Church Choir scenes. The Pizza Delivery sequence began in Downtown Cramerton, North Carolina and concluded at the Midtown Motor Inn in Gastonia, North Carolina. Both the DMV Driving Test and the Church Choir scenes were filmed on the campus of First Baptist Church in Cramerton, North Carolina. Scenes at The Pit Stop, the bar the characters frequent and Ricky Bobby and Jean Girard first meet were filmed in a recently closed sports bar in Charlotte. The scenes for the Bobby residence were filmed at a mansion near Lake Norman. 

McKay was adamant about wanting to incorporate stunts in the movie, and even had Ferrell and Reilly take driving classes at the Richard Petty Driving Experience with Ferrell later stating that he was "terrified" while driving the cars. Andy Hillenburg's Fast Track Enterprises and K4 Motorsports combined to provide race cars, hauler transportation and stunt coordination. Previously, the companies had assisted in promotion for Herbie: Fully Loaded, 3: The Dale Earnhardt Story, and other stock car racing films. Within Talladega Nights: The Ballad of Ricky Bobby, K4 Motorsports created custom wrapping for specific race cars, notably Bobby's "ME" car.

Reception

Box office

The film grossed US$47 million in its first week, and was the  1 film at the box office, making it at the time, the largest opening weekend of Ferrell's career, before being passed by 2014's The Lego Movie. The film grossed $148.2 million in the US and Canada, and $15.1 million in other territories for a total worldwide gross of $163 million making it Ferrell's fourth highest-grossing film behind The Lego Movie, Elf and Anchorman 2 and McKay's highest-grossing film behind Anchorman 2 and The Other Guys.

Critical response

On Rotten Tomatoes, the film has an approval rating of 71% based on 188 reviews, with an average rating of 6.51/10. The site's critical consensus reads: "Though it occasionally stalls, Talladega Nights mix of satire, clever gags, and excellent ensemble performances put it squarely in the winner's circle." On Metacritic, the film has a weighted average score of 66 out of 100, based on 33 critics, indicating "generally favorable reviews." Audiences surveyed by CinemaScore gave the film a grade "B" on scale of A+ to F.

Robert Koehler of Variety wrote: "Simultaneously teasing and loving a subject doesn't make for easy comedy, but writer-star Will Ferrell and director/co-writer Adam McKay pull it off with good-ol'-boy good nature in Talladega Nights: The Ballad of Ricky Bobby." Koehler was surprised by the racing aspects of the film, and praised McKay's direction and Oliver Wood cinematography, saying "he gets the grit, heat and feel of NASCAR racetracks with a near-documentary sensibility." Owen Gleiberman of Entertainment Weekly found the film increasingly uneven as it progressed but praised the racing sequences: "The races are scorchingly shot, and they lend the movie a zest that was missing from Anchorman."
Sheri Linden of The Hollywood Reporter wrote: "From its pitch-perfect title through just about every detail, this sendup of sports-triumph movies maintains the right parodic pitch, if not always the highest mph on the laugh speedometer."
British magazine Total Film gave it a perfect five-star rating, with the following verdict: "Forget the recent blips; Ferrell is back in freewheeling form. More than just the year's funniest film, Talladega Nights is one of the best films of the year." Automotive journalist Leo Parente said, "the most accurate racing film ever, trust me," while emphasizing that he was not being sarcastic.

Filmmaker Christopher Nolan cited the film as a personal favorite of his, calling it "great".

Promotional
V8 Supercars team Britek Motorsport incorporated the Talladega Nights logo into the paint scheme of their Ford Falcon BAs for the 2006 Sandown 500 and the 2006 Bathurst 1000.

The Supercars also featured Talladega Nights in a Drive-In Night event at Skyline Blacktown on August 2, 2018, to promote the upcoming race at Sydney Motorsport Park that weekend.

Both Will Ferrell and John C. Reilly appeared at the 2006 MTV Movie Awards in June of that year, in character, to promote the film. The two presented the award for "Best Comedic Performance".

Accolades

Home media

The Blu-ray version was released on November 17, 2006. Standard DVD and PSP UMD were released on December 12, 2006. When viewing, the opening menu gives viewers choices for Super Speedway (with footage of the film used as introductions for special features, scene selection, etc.) or Short Track (without video introductions). The film is presented on standard DVD in four different configurations, giving consumers the choice between either theatrical or unrated versions and anamorphic widescreen (2.40:1 aspect ratio) or pan and scan presentations. As for the audio, each standard DVD carries Dolby Digital 5.1 tracks in English and French with optional English and French subtitles.

Extras for the standard DVD editions include a retrospective "25 Years Later" commentary track featuring most of the main cast, deleted and extended scenes along with bonus race footage, features, interviews with Bobby, Naughton, and Carley, a gag reel, a 'line-o-rama' feature with alternate dialogue from the film, and DVD-ROM content. The unrated disc contains additional deleted scenes ("Cal Calls Ricky" and "What'd You Do Today?"), an interview with Girard and Gregory, and commercials. The "Unrated & Uncut" DVD omits two scenes that were in theaters: Bobby, as a child, steals his mother's station wagon and the happenings of Bobby's pit crew. The scenes are not present in the deleted scenes either.

The Blu-ray release is available on a dual-layer disc with the majority of features presented in high definition. These include: nine deleted/extended scenes, three interviews, gag reel, line-o-rama, bonus race footage, Bobby & Naughton's Commercials, Bobby & Naughton's public service announcements, Walker & Texas Ranger, Will Ferrell Returns to Talladega and a theatrical trailer. Three non-high definition extras include: Daytona 500 Spot, NASCAR Chase for the Nextel Cup Spot, and Sirius and NASCAR Spot. In terms of technical aspects, this edition carries the unrated cut and presents the film with a widescreen transfer at its 2.40:1 theatrical aspect ratio and includes Dolby Digital 5.1 tracks in English and French and an uncompressed PCM 5.1 audio track in English, along with English, French, Spanish, Chinese, Portuguese, Korean and Thai subtitles.

The first one million 60GB and 20GB PlayStation 3 units included a free Blu-ray copy of the film.

In October 2016, the film was re-released on Blu-Ray to coincide with its 10th anniversary. The 2-disc set includes all new bonus features, as well as both versions of the film, marking the theatrical version's first time on Blu-Ray disc.

Real-world homage
On the final lap of the 2009 Aaron's 499 (one of two Sprint Cup Series races at Talladega Superspeedway), Carl Edwards crashed after Brad Keselowski made contact with his car on the final lap. His car turned backwards, went airborne, bounced off and crushed Ryan Newman's hood, flew into the catch fence, and came to a stop on the track apron. At this point, his car was just beyond the pit-road exit, as Keselowski and Dale Earnhardt Jr. crossed the finish line. Edwards climbed out of his car and jogged to the finish line. He received a standing ovation from the crowd. Fox play-by-play commentator Mike Joy commented on how it was "shades of Ricky Bobby." Although Edwards did cross the finish line but on his feet, he was still handed a DNF since his car did not cross the line and Edwards finished in 24th. Edwards was later asked about this on Larry King Live; he responded, "I'm kind of a Will Ferrell fan. He did that at the end of Talladega Nights."

At the 2012 Aaron's 499 at Talladega, Kurt Busch's unsponsored No. 51 Phoenix Racing Chevrolet Impala used Ricky Bobby's "ME" paint scheme. Busch and his team were heard reciting movie lines over the team radio. He was running up front when contact from behind sent him spinning, he went on to finish 20th. In October 2013, Busch's No. 78 Furniture Row Racing Chevrolet was sponsored by Wonder Bread for the fall race at Talladega. Its paint scheme was based on Ricky's original No. 26. He finished 18th in the race.

During qualifying at the 2013 United States Grand Prix, Sebastian Vettel and his race engineer Guillaume "Rocky" Rocquelin made reference to the movie over team radio when Vettel posted the fastest lap and gained pole position. The pair referenced the movie in saying "shake and bake" over the team radio, the same phrase used by Bobby and Naughton.

During his victory lap and postrace interview following the 2021 Quaker State 400, driver Kurt Busch exclaimed "Shake and Bake!" in reference to his teammate Ross Chastain, who assisted Busch in holding off his brother Kyle Busch for the victory.

References

External links

 
 
 Counting Down: Talladega Nights Car Auction! (Featuring the makes and models of the cars)
 Talladega Nights: The Ballad of Ricky Bobby at Sony Pictures
 Everything You Need to Know About Talladega Nights: The Ballad of Ricky Bobby Movie (2006) at Movie Insider
 If You Ain't First, You're Last!: 10 Behind-The-Scenes Facts About Talladega Nights at Screenrant

2006 films
2006 comedy films
2000s English-language films
2000s sports comedy films
2006 LGBT-related films
American auto racing films
American LGBT-related films
American sports comedy films
American satirical films
Apatow Productions films
Columbia Pictures films
Films directed by Adam McKay
Films produced by Judd Apatow
Films scored by Alex Wurman
Films set in Alabama
Films set in North Carolina
Films set in Texas
Films shot in North Carolina
Films with screenplays by Adam McKay
Films with screenplays by Will Ferrell
LGBT-related sports comedy films
Midlife crisis films
NASCAR mass media
Relativity Media films
2000s American films